Kazuhisa Kondo (近藤和久, Kondo Kazuhisa; born April 2, 1959) is a Japanese mecha designer. He is known for working on the Gundam series.

Credited series/works

Manga
     Chi o nonda apāto - 1984
     MS Senki Kidō Senshi Gundam 0079 Gaiden (Record of MS Wars) - 1984
     Kidō Senshi Z Gundam Gaiden (Z Gundam Side Story) - 1986
     Shin MS senki kidō senshi Gundam 0079 tanpenshū (Record of MS Wars II) - 1988
     Mobile Suit Vor!! - (Mobile Suit Vor!!) 1989
     Operation Buran (Operation Buran) - 1990
     Kidō senshi Gundam 0079 (Gundam 0079) - 1992-1995
     Kidō senshi Z Gundam (Z Gundam) - 1994
     Kidō senshi Gundam Zion no saikō (The Revival of Zeon) - 1996
     Kidō senshi Gundam Operation: Troy - 2006-2007
     Kidō senshi Gundam Shin Zeon no Saikou - 2010-2011
     Kidō senshi Gundam the MSV: The Mobile Suit Variations (Gundam 0079) - 2011-2014
     Kidō Senshi Gundam - Na mo Naki Senjou (Gundam 0079) - 2013-2014

Anime
     Mobile Suit Zeta Gundam
     Mobile Suit Gundam 0080: War in the Pocket

References

Living people
1959 births
Japanese designers
Mechanical designers (mecha)